Ammon, the city "Where Tomorrow Begins," is a suburb city located directly between the Ammon foothills on the east and the city of Idaho Falls on the west, in Bonneville County, Idaho, United States. As of the 2010 US Census, the population of Ammon was 13,816.  By the 2020 census, Ammon's population had grown to 17,694.

Ammon was one of Idaho's fastest growing cities from 2000 to 2010. The city experienced a 123.3% growth rate from 2000 to 2010 based on the 2010 US Census. Ammon is the 15th largest city in Idaho.

History
Ammon was founded by members of the Church of Jesus Christ of Latter-day Saints in 1888. It was originally called South Iona because it was the dependent branch in the south end of the Iona, Idaho ward. The area was made a ward in the church in 1889 with Arthur M. Rawson as bishop, who renamed the town in honor of Ammon, a figure in the LDS book of scripture, the Book of Mormon. Since it was now independent of the Iona Ward, a new name seemed appropriate. On February 9, 1893, the name of the town was changed from South Iona Ward to Ammon.

By 1930 the village of Ammon had 270 inhabitants, but the total district of Ammon, which is how the name is usually used and is closer to the modern borders, had a population of about 1100.

Ammon was an early agricultural center and later was home to several general stores, a grain elevator and a brickyard. The city was officially incorporated on October 10, 1905. It became a Second Class City under Idaho law in 1963. In the early 1900s a spur line was built by the Union Pacific Railroad to the Ammon Elevator. Beginning in the 1940s housing divisions have aided the city's growth and it has become a suburb for the adjacent city of Idaho Falls. Building boomed in the 1990s in both the business and housing sectors, and the city was one of the fastest growing in Idaho from 2000 to 2010.

Education
Ammon is served by the Bonneville Joint School District#93. District #93 serves about 10,758 students in 19 schools, making it the fifth-largest by enrollment in the state of Idaho. The district has 14 elementary schools serving students in K–6, two middle schools serving students in grades 7–8, and three high schools serving students in grades 9–12, along with an alternative high school. A third middle school, Black Canyon Middle School, will open in the fall of 2021.

High schools 
 Bonnevile Online High School
 Bonneville High School

 Hillcrest High School

Thunder Ridge High School

Alternative high schools
 Lincoln Alternative High School

Middle schools
 Black Canyon Middle School
 Rocky Mountain Middle School
 Sandcreek Middle School

Elementary schools
 Ammon Elementary School
 Bridgewater Elementary School
 Cloverdale Elementary School
 Discovery Elementary School
 Fairview Elementary School
 Falls Valley Elementary School
 Hillview Elementary School
 Iona Elementary School
 Mountain Valley Elementary School
 Rimrock Elementary School
 Summit Hills Elementary School
 Tiebreaker Elementary School
 Ucon Elementary School
 Woodland Hills Elementary School

Geography
Ammon is located at  (43.476268, -111.967964).

Demographics

2010 census
As of the census of 2010, there were 13,816 people, 4,476 households, and 3,352 families residing in the city. The racial makeup of the city was 94.1% White, 0.5% African American, 0.5% Native American, 0.8% Asian, 0.1% Pacific Islander, 2.2% from other races, and 1.8% from two or more races. Hispanic or Latino of any race were 6.4% of the population.

There were 4,476 households, of which 46.4% had children under the age of 18 living with them, 61.4% were married couples living together, 10.1% had a female householder with no husband present, 3.4% had a male householder with no wife present, and 25.1% were non-families. 21.3% of all households were made up of individuals, and 8.2% had someone living alone who was 65 years of age or older. The average household size was 3.05 and the average family size was 3.61.

The median age in the city was 29.6 years. 36.3% of residents were under the age of 18; 7.7% were between the ages of 18 and 24; 27.5% were from 25 to 44; 18.7% were from 45 to 64; and 9.8% were 65 years of age or older. The gender makeup of the city was 48.9% male and 51.1% female.

2000 census
As of the 2000 Census there were 1,843 households, out of which 49.9% had children under the age of 18 living with them, 72.0% were married couples living together, 9.4% had a female householder with no husband present, and 16.1% were non-families. 13.8% of all households were made up of individuals, and 6.3% had someone living alone who was 65 years of age or older. The average household size was 3.27 and the average family size was 3.62.

In 2000 the city the population was spread out, with 36.3% under the age of 18, 8.9% from 18 to 24, 26.8% from 25 to 44, 18.4% from 45 to 64, and 9.6% who were 65 years of age or older. The median age was 29 years. For every 100 females, there were 97.0 males. For every 100 females age 18 and over, there were 89.6 males.

The median income for a household in the city in 2000 was $47,820, and the median income for a family was $51,544. Males had a median income of $41,126 versus $21,301 for females. The per capita income for the city was $16,535. About 3.4% of families and 5.6% of the population were below the poverty line, including 5.0% of those under age 18 and 9.6% of those age 65 or over.

City of Ammon Fiber Optics
Ammon builds, owns, and operates a fiber-to-the-premises system. Ammon provides the fiber to the premises, and relies on third party ISPs to connect customers to the Internet and other services.

Notes

External links
 Ammon, Idaho Official Site

Cities in Idaho
Cities in Bonneville County, Idaho
Cities in Idaho Falls metropolitan area
Populated places established in 1889